Nesikep is an unincorporated settlement in British Columbia, Canada, located at the mouth of Nesikep Creek in the Fraser Canyon, to the south of Lillooet and southeast of Texas Creek. It is primarily defined by Nesikep Indian Reserve No. 6 and Nesikep Indian Reserve No. 6A. Nesikep Indian Reserve No. 6 flanks both sides of the Fraser, though the community is only on the right (west) bank.

See also
List of communities in British Columbia

References

Settlements in British Columbia
Fraser Canyon
Lillooet Country